Edmee Sophie Gail née Garre (28 August 1775 – 24 July 1819) was a French singer and composer.

Life
Sophie Garre was born in Paris in the parish of Saint Sulpice, the daughter of Marie-Louise Adelaide Colloz and surgeon Claude-Francois Garre (1730–1799). She studied piano as a child and published her first composition, a romance, at the age of 14. At the age of 19, she married editor Jean-Baptiste Gail (1755–1829) and had one son, Jean François Gail.

She and her husband divorced in 1801, and Sophie Garre toured as a singer in Europe. She studied with Fétis, Perne and Sigismund Neukomm and wrote an opera comique as her first work for theater. She died in Paris.

Works
Selected works include:
1797, Deus airs for the drama Montoni
1813, Les deux jaloux, opéra comique in one act
1814, Il est vrai que Thibaut mérite, romance
1853, Ma Fanchette est charmante, trio
1813, Mademoiselle de Launay à la Bastille, opéra-comique in one act
1813 Ma liberté, ma liberté, romance
1814, Angela ou L'atelier de Jean Cousin, opéra comique in 1 act
1814, La Méprise, opéra comique in 1 act
1818, La Sérénade, opéra
1807, N'est-ce pas elle, romance with piano accompaniment
1807, La jeune et charmante Isabelle, romance
1808, Heure de soir, romance with piano and harp accompaniment
1814, Les devoirs du chevalier, romance on a poème de Creuzé de Lesser
1814, Variations concertantes for flute and piano
1861, Transcription variée de Moeris for piano
1815, Prière aux songes, nocturne à deux voix sur un poème de M. Cheurlin, with piano and harp accompaniment
1815, Le souvenir du diable
1838, Le Diable, chansonnette sur un poème d'Arnault with piano
1838, A mes fleurs, with piano
1820, Les langueurs et le Le Serment, nocturnes with piano

References

External links
 

1775 births
1819 deaths
18th-century classical composers
19th-century classical composers
French women classical composers
French opera composers
Burials at Père Lachaise Cemetery
19th-century French composers
Women opera composers
18th-century French composers
19th-century women composers
18th-century women composers